The 's-Hertogenbosch Red Eagles are an ice hockey team in 's-Hertogenbosch, the Netherlands. Previously part of the BeNe League, they have played in the Eerste Divisie since the 2017–2018 season.

History
The club was founded in 1965 and first participated in the Eredivisie during the 1966–1967 season. They won the league in the 1969–1970 season, finishing with an undefeated record.

Achievements
Eredivisie champion (1): 1970.
Eerste Divisie champion (4): 1977, 1978, 1988, 2009.
HTG-Bokaal champion (2): 1991, 2000.
Coupe der Lage Landen champion (1): 1988.

External links
 
 Team profile on eurohockey.com

 
Ice hockey teams in the Netherlands
Sports clubs in 's-Hertogenbosch